Nobil Air was an airline based in Chişinău, Moldova. It operated VIP charter services. Its main base was in Chişinău International Airport.

The Nobil Air air operators certificate permitted the transport of passengers (as at July 2007).

In 2015, the airline was rebranded as Classica Air.

History
The airline was established in 2003. The airline's Learjet 35 was delivered in September 2004 and it began operating in November 2004. It was the first of its type to be delivered and operated in Moldova and it had been used to transport former Moldovan president Vladimir Voronin.

Fleet

As of November 2011, the current Nobil Air fleet consists of a single Bombardier Learjet 60.

External links
Nobil Air

References

Defunct airlines of Moldova
Airlines established in 2003
Airlines disestablished in 2015
2003 establishments in Moldova